Several ships of the British Royal Navy have been named HMS Newmarket.

 , an auxiliary minesweeper active during the First World War and sunk on 17 July 1917.
 , a  provided under lend-lease from the US Navy in 1940 and scrapped in 1945.

Royal Navy ship names